Appias sylvia, the woodland albatross white or common albatross, is a butterfly in the family Pieridae. It is found in Senegal, Gambia, Guinea, Sierra Leone, Liberia, Ivory Coast, Ghana, Togo, Benin, Nigeria, Equatorial Guinea (Bioko), Cameroon, the Republic of the Congo, the Central African Republic, the Democratic Republic of the Congo, Sudan, Ethiopia, Angola, Namibia, Zambia, Kenya, Uganda, Tanzania and Malawi. The habitat consists of forests.

Males come to damp patches and both sexes are attracted to flowers.

The larvae feed on Drypetes (including Drypetes ugandensis and Drypetes gerrardii), Phyllanthus and Ritchiea species.

Subspecies
A. s. sylvia (Senegal, Gambia, Guinea, Sierra Leone, Liberia, Ivory Coast, Ghana, Togo, Benin, southern Nigeria, Bioko, Cameroon, Congo, Central African Republic, northern Democratic Republic of the Congo)
A. s. abyssinica Talbot, 1932 (south-western Ethiopia)
A. s. nyasana (Butler, 1897) (Democratic Republic of the Congo, north-eastern Namibia, north-eastern Zambia, western Kenya, Uganda, Tanzania, Malawi)
A. s. sudanensis Talbot, 1932 (southern Sudan)
A. s. zairiensis Berger, 1981 (Democratic Republic of the Congo)

References

Seitz, A. Die Gross-Schmetterlinge der Erde 13: Die Afrikanischen Tagfalter. Plate XIII 12

Butterflies described in 1775
Appias (butterfly)
Taxa named by Johan Christian Fabricius